Le Boulvé (Languedocien: Lo Bolben) is a former commune in the Lot department in southwestern France. On 1 January 2019, it was merged into the new commune Porte-du-Quercy.

Population

See also
Communes of the Lot department

References

Former communes of Lot (department)